Maxwell 'Max' Charles Tucker (born 22 December 1991) is an Australian born Hong Kong cricketer.  Tucker is a left-handed batsman who is a right-arm bowler.  He was born in Melbourne, Victoria.

Having played age group cricket for Hong Kong Under-19s in the 2010 Under-19 World Cup, he made his World Cricket League debut for Hong Kong in the 2011 World Cricket League Division Two.  It was in this tournament that he made his List A debut against Uganda.  He played a further List A match in the competition, against Papua New Guinea.  In his first match he was dismissed for a duck by Frank Nsubuga.  He bowled 3 wicket-less overs in this match, for the cost of 16 runs.  In his second match, he scored 2 runs before being dismissed by Andrew McIntosh.  With the ball he claimed a single wicket, that of Tony Ura for the cost of 23 runs from 6 overs.

He is the son of Darren Tucker, who played 2 List A matches for New South Wales in 1989.  His uncle is Rod Tucker, who played first-class cricket for New South Wales and Tasmania, and who is currently on the ICC Elite Umpire Panel.

References

External links
Max Tucker at ESPNcricinfo
Max Tucker at CricketArchive

1991 births
Living people
Cricketers from Melbourne
Hong Kong people of Australian descent
Australian cricketers
Hong Kong cricketers